is a Japanese football player. He currently plays for SC Sagamihara.

Career statistics
Updated to 23 February 2016.

References

External links

Profile at SC Sagamihara

1985 births
Living people
Ryutsu Keizai University alumni
Association football people from Chiba Prefecture
Japanese footballers
J2 League players
J3 League players
Tochigi SC players
SC Sagamihara players
Association football defenders